Shiekh Mohammad Qasim Rasikh Turkmen (شیخ مولوی محمد قاسم راسخ ترکمن) is an Afghan Taliban leader and Hadith scholar. He is currently serving as Deputy Chief Justice of Supreme Court of the Islamic Emirate of Afghanistan alongside Sheikh Abdul Malik since 28 October 2021. He has also served as a member of the negotiation team in the Qatar office.

Early life and education
Qasim was born in 1971 to Mullah Juma Nazar in Anpikal village of the Fayzabad District of Jowzjan Province, Afghanistan. He received his primary religious and contemporary education from his home country. He completed the hadith course from darul uloom Mazhar Ul Uloom, located in Dagai village in Swabi District of Khyber Pakhtunkhwa, Pakistan.

Career
Qasim has taught sharia in different religious schools for 15 years and also served as Sheikh-ul-Hadees for ten years. He has also served as a member of the Da'wah Wal Irshad Commission of Ministry for the Propagation of Virtue and the Prevention of Vice and its provincial head of Jowzjan Province from 2007 to 2016. From 2016 to 2020 he has served as the appeal judge of the Taliban military court for 20 eastern and northern provinces. He was a member of the Leadership Council and the negotiating team in Qatar.

References

1971 births
Living people
People from Jowzjan Province
Afghan judges
Sharia judges
Afghan Islamists
Supreme Court Justices of Afghanistan